The Georges Delerue Award for Best Music, or Georges Delerue Prize / Prix Georges Delerue, is an award for the best film score.  It is named after the French composer Georges Delerue, and was first awarded at the 1985 Film Fest Gent festival. Past winners include: Benny Andersson, Ry Cooder, Bruno Coulais, Jean-Luc Godard, Michael Kamen, Astor Piazzolla, Rachel Portman, Howard Shore, Toru Takemitsu, and Vangelis.

Awards
Each year, two prizes are awarded of €10,000 and €15,000. Winners are sometimes declared using the following categories:
Best Musical Documentary (shortened to 'BMD' in the table below)
Best Use of Existing Music (shortened to 'BUEM' in the table below)
Best Original Music (shortened to 'BOM' in the table below)
Best Application of Music (shortened to 'BAM' in the table below)
Best Use of Music in Film (shortened to 'BUMF' in the table below)

Award winners

References

External links 
 Film Fest Gent, 2016
 Ghent International Film Festival IMDb
 Gand: Prix Georges Delerue

 
Film music awards
Film awards for best score
Belgian film awards
Belgian music awards
International film awards
Awards established in 1985
Lists of films by award
 
1985 establishments in Belgium